The 2010 NCAA Division I Outdoor Track and Field Championships were the 89th NCAA Men's Division I Outdoor Track and Field Championships and the 29th NCAA Women's Division I Outdoor Track and Field Championships at Hayward Field in Eugene, Oregon on the campus of the University of Oregon from  June 9–12, 2010.

In total, thirty-six different men's and women's track and field events were contested.

Results

Men's events

100 meters
Final results shown, not prelims

Wind: +2.5

200 meters
Final results shown, not prelims

Wind: +3.7

400 meters
Final results shown, not prelims

800 meters
Final results shown, not prelims

1500 meters
Only top eight final results shown; no prelims are listed

5000 meters
Only top eight final results shown

10,000 meters
Only top eight final results shown

110 meters hurdles
Final results shown, not prelims

Wind: +0.7

400 meters hurdles
Final results shown, not prelims

3000 meter steeplechase
Only top eight final results shown

4x100 meters relay
Final results shown, not prelims

Note:  Only finishing teams

4x400 meters relay
Final results shown, not prelims

High jump
Only top eight final results shown

Pole vault
Only top eight final results shown

Long jump
Only top eight final results shown

Triple jump
Only top eight final results shown

Shot put
Only top eight final results shown

Discus
Only top eight final results shown

Javelin throw
Only top eight final results shown

Hammer throw
Only top eight final results shown

Decathlon
Only top eight final results shown

Women's events

100 meters
Final results shown, not prelims
Wind +2.8

200 meters
Final results shown, not prelims
Wind +1.2

400 meters
Final results shown, not prelims

800 meters
Final results shown, not prelims

1500 meters
Final results shown, not prelims

5000 meters
Final results shown, not prelims

10000 meters
Final results shown, not prelims

100 meters hurdles
Final results shown, not prelims
Wind: +1.8

400 meters hurdles
Final results shown, not prelims

3000 meter steeplechase
Only top eight final results shown

4x100 meters relay
Final results shown, not prelims

4x400 meters relay
Final results shown, not prelims

High jump
Only top eight final results shown

Pole vault
Only top eight final results shown

Long jump
Only top eight final results shown

Triple jump
Only top eight final results shown

Shot put
Only top eight final results shown

Discus
Only top eight final results shown

Javelin throw
Only top eight final results shown

Hammer throw
Only top eight final results shown

Heptathlon
Only top eight final results shown

References

NCAA Men's Outdoor Track and Field Championship
NCAA Division I Outdoor Track And Field Championships
NCAA Division I Outdoor Track And Field Championships
NCAA Women's Outdoor Track and Field Championship